A  is an announcer who calls a professional sumo wrestler, or rikishi, to the dohyō (wrestling ring) immediately prior to his bout. He does this by calling the name of each wrestler fighting in turn while holding a traditional folding fan.

Uniform
The outfit worn by the yobidashi is loosely based on an old style Japanese workman's outfit, with leggings and split-toed tabi-like boots. The kimono often displays an advertiser's name in black characters.

Responsibilities
In keeping with their workman outfits, the yobidashi are actually the Japan Sumo Association's handymen, or odd-job men, and have a wide variety of tasks.  These include on match days: sweeping the ring, providing purification salt, displaying banners showing that a match has been decided by default (usually due to a competitor's withdrawal),  or subject to a rematch after the next two bouts, and ensuring that, during a bout, no wrestler injures himself on the bucket of chikara-mizu (power water) situated at one corner of the ring. They also can be seen displaying the advertising banners of companies who sponsor particular match-ups between popular wrestlers. They also are responsible for playing drums outside the arena (traditionally to attract customers) on match days.

The yobidashi also build the clay wrestling ring (or dohyō) for tournaments and display competitions, and rings for the training stables. There is also a tradition of the yobidashi writing songs, called "jinku", based on sumo life.

Career and ranking

There are 44 yobidashi as of September 2018. Like gyōji, yobidashi typically enter the sumo world as teenagers and work up a career ladder roughly based on the ranking system for wrestlers, as described until their retirement at 65.  The current ranking system was created in July 1993 and consists of the following nine ranks:

 tate-yobidashi (立呼出)
 fuku-tate-yobidashi (副立呼出)
 san'yaku-yobidashi (三役呼出)
 makuuchi-yobidashi (幕内呼出)
 jūryō-yobidashi (十両呼出)
 makushita-yobidashi (幕下呼出)
 sandanme-yobidashi (三段目呼出)
 jonidan-yobidashi (序二段呼出)
 jonokuchi-yobidashi (序ノ口呼出)

Most of these ranks clearly follow those for the rikishi, or wrestlers, with the exception of the tate and fuku-tate ranks, which stand for chief and deputy chief, respectively. This system is identical to that applied for gyōji. Prior to July 1993, yobidashi were simply ranked first-class, second-class and so on. As of October 2019 the tate-yobidashi position is vacant after the incumbent, Takuro from the Kasugano stable, was suspended for two tournaments and announced his retirement for hitting a junior yobidashi over the head after he caught him eating in the customer seating area on jungyō.

Promotion through these ranks is based primarily on experience, although ability is also taken into account, particularly in promotions to the top ranks.

Ring names
Yobidashi take a single name as their ring name, unlike both the wrestlers (rikishi) and gyōji who have both a surname and given name.  This may be related to the practice of the Edo period in Japan whereby only samurai class persons could hold a surname.  The wrestlers (involved in a martial activity) and gyōji (who were lettered) could be construed as having positions consistent with a samurai status, while the yobidashi did not.

As from July 1993 the upper ranked yobidashi also had their names included on the banzuke, the ranking sheet produced prior to each honbasho. Apart from a brief period previously, only the gyōji had traditionally been included on the banzuke in addition to the wrestlers and their training stablemasters, or oyakata, again indicating the difference in status of the two jobs.

External links

List of current yobidashi at Japan Sumo Association homepage
Interview with a yobidashi

References

Sumo people
Japanese words and phrases
Sumo terminology